Prince Alexander Ferdinand Albrecht Achilles Wilhelm Joseph Viktor Karl Feodor of Prussia (26 December 1912 – 12 June 1985) was the only son of Prince August Wilhelm of Prussia and his wife Princess Alexandra Victoria of Schleswig-Holstein-Sonderburg-Glücksburg.

Family and early life

Prince Alexander of Prussia was born on 26 December 1912 to Prince August Wilhelm of Prussia and his wife Princess Alexandra Victoria of Schleswig-Holstein-Sonderburg-Glücksburg. August Wilhelm was a younger son of Kaiser Wilhelm II.

His parents divorced in 1920 and his mother remarried less than two years later; custody of the young prince was awarded to Alexander's father.

Alexander attended the 1932 wedding of the Swedish prince Gustaf Adolf, Duke of Västerbotten with Princess Sibylla of Saxe-Coburg-Gotha in the former duchy of Coburg; it was the first time that a member of the German imperial family had entered the duchy since it became a republic, or specifically a part of Bavaria in November 1919 after the ruling duke, Carl Eduard, had ended his reign on 14 November 1918.

Nazi Party and military career
As of November 1939, Prince Alexander was a first lieutenant in the Air Force Signal Corps, stationed in Wiesbaden.

Like his father, who became a prominent supporter of the Nazi Party, Alexander became an early supporter. Prince August had secret hopes that Chancellor Adolf Hitler "would one day hoist him or his son Alexander up to the vacant throne of the Kaiser". The support that father and son gave to the emerging party caused strong disagreements among the Hohenzollerns, with Wilhelm II urging them both to leave the party.

In 1933, Alexander quit the SA and became a private in the German regular army. In 1934, Berlin reports leaked out that the prince quit the SA because Hitler had chosen 21-year-old Alexander to succeed him as "head man in Germany when he [Hitler] no longer can carry the torch". The report went on to say however that Joseph Goebbels was expected to oppose the prince's nomination.

Unlike many other German princes, who became the targets of Hitler's mistrust and were removed from their commands in the military, Alexander was the only Hohenzollern allowed to remain at his post.

Marriage
On 19 December 1938 in the Dresden garrison church, Alexander non-dynastically married Armgard Weygand (22 August 1912 – 3 December 2001), daughter of Major Friedrich Weygand and Karla Franziska Oheim. She was the widow of a major in the German Air Force, and was originally from Wiesbaden, where Alexander Ferdinand was stationed. As the marriage had not been dynastically approved, none of his relatives attended the ceremony, but fellow officers served as witnesses.

They had one son:

Prince Stephan Alexander Dieter Friedrich of Prussia (30 September 1939 – 12 February 1993); he married  Heide Schmidt (born 6 February 1939) on 28 February 1964 and they were divorced in 1976. They have one daughter. He remarried Hannelore-Maria Kerscher (born 26 October 1952) on 19 June 1981. 
Princess Stephanie Viktoria-Luise of Prussia (21 September 1966); she married Amadi Mbaraka Bao (born in 1958 in Tanzania) on 19 April 1991. They were divorced on 20 July 1999.

Death
Prince Alexander Ferdinand died on 12 June 1985 at Wiesbaden.

Ancestry

References

External links

1912 births
1985 deaths
House of Hohenzollern
Prussian princes
Royalty in the Nazi Party